Anabel Solís Sosa (born September 17, 1987) is a Mexican actress and former beauty queen who represented her country in the 60th international Miss World pageant, to be held October 30, 2010, in People's Republic of China.

Nuestra Belleza México (Miss World Mexico)

Anabel Solís competed against thirty-three other young women in the 2009 Nuestra Belleza México pageant.

See also
 Ximena Navarrete
 Nuestra Belleza México 2009
 Miss World 2010

References

1987 births
Nuestra Belleza México winners
Miss World 2010 delegates
People from Mérida, Yucatán
Actresses from Yucatán (state)
21st-century Mexican actresses
Living people